Benjamin Cummings is a publishing imprint of Pearson Education that specializes in science. Benjamin Cummings publishes medical textbooks, anatomy and physiology laboratory manuals, biology and microbiology textbooks, and health/kinesiology textbooks.

Cummings Publishing Company was formed in 1968 as a division of Addison-Wesley. In 1977, Addison-Wesley purchased the W. A. Benjamin Company and merged it with Cummings. Benjamin Cummings, along with the rest of Addison-Wesley, was purchased by Pearson in 1988.

References

External links
 

Book publishing companies based in San Francisco
Pearson plc
Publishing companies established in 1977